Optical Character Recognition is a Unicode block containing signal characters for OCR and MICR standards.

Block

Subheadings

The Optical Character Recognition block has three informal subheadings (groupings) within its character collection: OCR-A, MICR, and OCR.

OCR-A

The OCR bow tie is given the informative alias "unique asterisk".

MICR

The latter two characters are misnamed: their names were inadvertently switched when they were named in the 1993 (first) edition of ISO/IEC 10646, a mistake which had been present since Unicode 1.0.0.

These symbols had previously been encoded by the ISO-IR-98 encoding defined by ISO 2033:1983, in which they were simply named  through . All four characters have informative aliases in the Unicode charts: "transit", "amount", "on us", and "dash" respectively.

OCR

The OCR subheading consists of a single character: .

History
The following Unicode-related documents record the purpose and process of defining specific characters in the Optical Character Recognition block:

References 

Unicode blocks